Carl Geibel (né Carl Stephan Franz; 19 May 1842 - 5 June 1910) was a Hungarian-born German book dealer and publisher.

Life

Family
Carl Stephan Franz Geibel was born in Pest (today the central part of Budapest) where his parents were living in connection with his father's business.   He was the eldest of his parents' four recorded sons.   His father,  (1806-1884), was also a successful book dealer and publisher.   Carl Geibel, the father, came originally from Halle.   The mother, born Leonore Weisz, had been born in 1820 in Szeged, a city to the south of Budapest. His brother, Stephan Geibel (1847–1903), was the Managing Director of Pierer'sche Hofbuchdruckerei. Stephan Geibel & Co., a book publisher based in Altenburg.  Carl Geibel and his father were both investors in the Altenburg publisher.

Carl Geibel (1842-1910) married Mathilde Baumgarten in 1870:  she came from a family of  prosperous Leipzig lawyers.   This marriage, too, produced four recorded sons.

Education
The family lived in Pest till 1850, by which time Carl Geibel (1842-1910) had become fluent in Hungarian.   After that, again in connection with his father's business activities, they moved to Leipzig.   He attended St. Thomas School and then, between 1855 and 1858, the Ausfeld educational establishment in Schnepfenthal.   After this he embarked on an apprenticeship in the book trade, initially with the pioneering book dealer .

Publishing
He moved on to work successively in Gotha, Dorpat (as it was known at that time) and Budapest.

In 1874 his father fell seriously ill with lung disease and had to spend his winters at a cure resort on the Riviera.   After a few years he recovered up to a point, and lived for another ten years, actively involved in the business.   Nevertheless, from 1874 it was the son who was taking the lead role in running the business.   During the final decades of the nineteenth century Duncker & Humblot, like many German publishing firms, grew strongly, focusing in subjects such as law and social sciences, and becoming one of the empire's leading academic publishers.

Recognition
The Law faculty at Leipzig University awarded Geibel an honorary doctorate in 1902 in appreciation of Duncker & Humblot's contribution as academic and legal publishers.

References

19th-century publishers (people)
20th-century publishers (people)
Businesspeople from Budapest
Businesspeople from Leipzig

1842 births
1910 deaths